Maxim Mamin may refer to:

Maxim Mamin (ice hockey, born 1988), Russian ice hockey player
Maxim Mamin (ice hockey, born 1995), Russian ice hockey player